Pellaniki Premalekha Priyuraliki Subhalekha is a 1992 Telugu-language comedy film produced by Vadde Naveen under the Sri Nalini Cine Creations banner and directed by Relangi Narasimha Rao. It stars Rajendra Prasad, Sruthi and Nandini, with music composed by J. V. Raghavulu. The film was recorded as Average at the box office.

Plot 
Raja (Rajendra Prasad) is a faithful husband who loves his wife, Keerti (Sruthi), very much. Keerti is a very simple and devoted wife whose life completely revolves around her husband. Raja and Keerti's relationship is like any newlywed couple's. They live a peaceful life and they believe that nothing could ever change that. Until one day, Raja runs into a beautiful girl named Swathi (Nandini). Raja likes the fact that she's a modern-day woman whose thoughts are very forward. He slowly takes a liking to her without telling her that he's married to another woman. Raja juggles between his wife and his newfound girlfriend for a while and tries hard to avoid suspicion. But eventually, Keerti finds out the truth and goes to face her husband's mistress only to learn that the mistress is no other than her old college friend, Swathi. After gaining their composure, both women feel betrayed and decide to teach Raja a lesson. So, they pretend to not know the truth and continue acting the same way they were. Keerti and Swathi's plan takes effect and Raja starts to feel the pressure of maintaining two relationships. The story reveals what happens to Raja, Keerti, and Swati's unconventional relationship.

Cast 
Rajendra Prasad as Raja
Sruthi as Keerthi
Nandini as Swathi
Brahmanandam as Lakshman Rao
Babu Mohan as Dusyanthudu
Gundu Hanumantha Rao as Sannassi
Kaasi Viswanath as Inspector
Krishna Chaitanya as Khan Saab
Srilakshmi as Lakshman Rao's wife
Pakhija as Dusyanthudu's wife
Chandrika as Dusyanthudu's wife

Soundtrack 

Music composed by J. V. Raghavulu. Music released on Surya Audio Company.

Other 
 VCDs and DVDs on – SHALIMAR Video Company, Hyderabad

References 

Films scored by J. V. Raghavulu
Films directed by Relangi Narasimha Rao